The Doyle Owl is the unofficial mascot of Reed College.  It is a roughly three-foot high, 300 pound (136 kg), concrete statue of an owl that originally occupied the lawn of a Portland resident. One night in 1913, the Owl was stolen from the lawn by residents of the Doyle dormitory, part of Reed's Old Dorm Block. The Owl was promptly hoisted atop the dorm building, where it drew the attention and envy of neighboring dorms. According to the 2006–2007 Student Body Handbook, however, the Doyle Owl may have originated as an ornament atop the Doyle dorm, from which it was removed as a "dorm memento".

The Owl was first stolen in a 1913 dorm war. Another dorm kidnapped nine residents of Doyle, offering to exchange the captives for the Owl. This did not work and the "hostages" escaped. The same rival dorm staged a two-hour siege on Doyle, featuring water, mud, and ammonia bombs.  Doyle countered by using a firehose but the tradition was born.

Over the years the Owl has been stolen countless times. However, an odd feature has accompanied this thievery. Whenever it is stolen, the stealers must flaunt it at a "showing," where elaborate measures are taken to display the Owl while reducing the odds of it being re-stolen by a new group.  Often the resulting brawl involves the majority of the student body. 
The Owl appeared hidden in the grass in the Sowing the Seeds of Love music video for the band Tears for Fears after video editor Mike Quinn told Director Jim Blashfield about the Doyle Owl tradition a Reed, where his younger brother was a student. Other "showings" have included encasing it in ice, covering it in Vaseline while hanging it off the Blue Bridge, setting it on fire (using baking oil) and throwing it out the back of a speeding car.

Temporary possessors of the Owl also traditionally take pictures of themselves next to the Owl, to prove their possession, and pictures of the Owl in strange places and with unusual people have become de rigueur; it has been seen in the US at Disneyland, in Seattle, in San Francisco, and in Lincoln, Nebraska.  The Owl has been pictured in the company of Steve Jobs and Dr. Demento. The Reed Office of Admissions feeds the air of myth surrounding the Owl, with its website claiming Owl sightings in Paris, France, and in Jakarta, Indonesia. The Doyle Owl also has its own profile on tribe.net.

Angel Dawson, a 1983 Reed graduate, devoted her senior thesis to studying the anthropological implications of the Doyle Owl cult-following. In interviews with Reed students and faculty, she examines how stories are passed down through generations of students. Among the contributing interviewees is former President Paul Bragdon.

Notable Owl Thieves 

 In spring of 2022, the first owl reveal since the start of the COVID-19 pandemic, the owl was won by residents of Russian House and their allies. Their win was assisted by the Reed College Rugby Team.    
 Stolen early November 2022 by unknown captors.

External links
Alumnus tells of his encounter with a Doyle Owl "showing."
Doyle Owl video from May 2003
March 2007 video of Reed students surfing on the Doyle Owl as it is towed behind a truck

References

Fictional owls
Reed College